Maribel Aguilera Cháirez (born 20 December 1977) is a Mexican politician affiliated with Morena. She is a federal deputy in the LXIV Legislature of the Mexican Congress, representing the third federal electoral district of Durango.

Life

Aguilera Cháirez obtained a law degree from the Universidad Juárez del Estado de Durango. In 2004, she was tapped to head the Durango Women's Institute (IMD), a post she left in 2007 to run for office. She was a local deputy in the Durango state legislature from 2007–10, entering the state legislature at the age of 29, and was an unused alternate federal deputy in the LXI Legislature.

In February 2018, Aguilera left PRI to join Morena along with several other former legislators from Durango. She was elected to the Chamber of Deputies in 2018 and serves on three commissions: Rural Development and Conservation; Migratory Matters; and Economy, Commerce and Competitiveness.

Aguilera is also the president of the Asociación de Mujeres de México y el Mundo, A.C. (Association of Women of Mexico and the World).

References

Living people
Politicians from Durango
Women members of the Chamber of Deputies (Mexico)
Members of the Chamber of Deputies (Mexico) for Durango
Morena (political party) politicians
1955 births
Members of the Congress of Durango
Universidad Juárez del Estado de Durango alumni
21st-century Mexican politicians
21st-century Mexican women politicians
Deputies of the LXIV Legislature of Mexico